Cristian Ionescu (born 1 March 1978) is a Romanian former footballer. He played as a left back.

Honours
Sheriff Tiraspol:
Moldovan National Division: 2005–06
Moldovan Cup: 2006
Moldovan Super Cup: 2005
FC Brașov:
Liga II: 2007–08

External links

1978 births
Living people
Romanian footballers
Expatriate footballers in Moldova
Romanian expatriate sportspeople in Moldova
Expatriate footballers in Azerbaijan
FC Sheriff Tiraspol players
FC Baku players
FC Brașov (1936) players
FC Rapid București players
CS Sportul Snagov players
Liga I players
Liga II players
Association football defenders